Beaver Dam (also Beaverdam) is an unincorporated community on the northeastern edge of Box Elder County, Utah, United States.

History
Beaver Dam was settled in 1867 by people from the nearby communities of Providence and Deweyville and was named for the numerous beaver dams along nearby Willow Creek.

In 1868, the first co-op dairy in Utah was established there.

See also

References

Unincorporated communities in Box Elder County, Utah
Unincorporated communities in Utah
Populated places established in 1867